The Great Divide is an American Red Dirt music group, originally from Stillwater, Oklahoma. The Great Divide formed its own record label, publishing company and operating company, and began recording. The group's first two albums, Goin' For Broke and Break In The Storm, were independent releases. Atlantic Records signed the group and re-released Break In The Storm as well as the band's third album, Revolutions. Remain, the group's fifth album, was released independently at the end of 2002.

The Great Divide originally consisted of bassist Kelley Green, singer-songwriter Mike McClure and brothers Scott and J.J. Lester (rhythm guitar and drums, respectively). McCLure left the band in early 2003 to pursue a career highlighting his originals and helping other bands record albums. The band continued with new singer Micah Aills but broke up after the release of "Under Your Own Sun" in 2005.

On August 26, 2011, the original members reunited for an appearance and are still together today touring. The album "25 Years of the Great Divide", comprising 31 tracks, was released to celebrate their 25th anniversary in 2018. On August 26, 2022, the band released "Good Side" as a single from the "Providence" album.

Discography

Albums

Singles

Music videos

References

External links

Musical groups from Oklahoma
Atlantic Records artists